The Legislative Assembly of New Brunswick is the deliberative assembly of the New Brunswick Legislature, in the province of New Brunswick, Canada. The assembly's seat is located in Fredericton. It was established in Saint John de jure when the colony was created in 1784 but came into session only in 1786, following the first elections in late 1785. The legislative assembly was originally the lower house in a bicameral legislature. Its upper house counterpart, the Legislative Council of New Brunswick, was abolished in 1891.  Its members are called "Members of the Legislative Assembly," commonly referred to as "MLAs".

History
Nova Scotia originally covered most of the territory of today's Maritime provinces. In 1784, New Brunswick became a distinct colony from Nova Scotia. Saint John was chosen as the original capital when New Brunswick was formed as it was the centre of commerce and the only city at that time. 

The first elections took place in November 1785. The legislative assembly came into session in January 1786. It was originally the lower house in a bicameral legislature. Its upper house counterpart, the Legislative Council of New Brunswick, was abolished on April 16, 1891.

Legislative Building 
The New Brunswick Legislative Building is the current building that houses the Assembly. It opened in 1882, having been constructed by J.C. Dumaresq, following the destruction of the original building, known as Province Hall, by fire in 1880.

The legislative chamber is designed to have four rows on the government side and three rows on the opposition side. This is because elections have traditionally yielded a strong government majority; in fact on occasion, even with many of the seats on one side of the House, the government has spilled over to the opposition side.  Quite often the House is oriented to have only two rows on the opposition benches, in the event of a large opposition adding a third row makes the opposition benches rather crowded.

Seating plan

Current members

See also

:Category:Members of the Legislative Assembly of New Brunswick
53rd New Brunswick Legislative Assembly
54th New Brunswick Legislative Assembly
55th New Brunswick Legislative Assembly
56th New Brunswick Legislative Assembly
57th New Brunswick Legislative Assembly
58th New Brunswick Legislative Assembly
59th New Brunswick Legislative Assembly
60th New Brunswick Legislative Assembly

References

Further reading 

  

New Brunswick Legislature
New Brunswick
New Brunswick
1784 establishments in New Brunswick